Christopher Theoret Duarte (born June 13, 1997) is a Dominican professional basketball player for the Indiana Pacers of the National Basketball Association (NBA). He played college basketball for the Northwest Florida State Raiders and the Oregon Ducks. At Northwest Florida State, he was named NABC NJCAA Player of the Year in 2019. At Oregon, he received the 2021 Jerry West Award as the nation's top collegiate shooting guard.

Early life and high school career
Duarte was born and raised in Puerto Plata, Dominican Republic. His father was Canadian & died when Duarte was six months old. He shared a love of basketball with his older brother Jean Michel. He moved to New York to play his final two years of high school basketball at Redemption Christian Academy in Troy. He participated in the 2017 Jordan Brand Classic Regional Game. Ranked the fifth-best player in New York by 247Sports, Duarte originally committed to play college basketball for Western Kentucky but instead started his career at Northwest Florida State College.

College career

Northwest Florida State (2017–2019) 
In his freshman season for Northwest Florida State College, Duarte averaged 12.1 points, 6.7 rebounds and two steals in 23.3 minutes per game, earning first-team All-Panhandle Conference honors and helping his team reach the Elite Eight round of the NJCAA Division I Championship. On September 20, 2018, he announced that he would continue his career at NCAA Division I program Oregon after one more season at Northwest Florida State.

As a sophomore, Duarte averaged 19 points, 7.1 rebounds and 2.5 assists per game, helping his team return to the Elite Eight round of the NJCAA Division I Tournament. He scored 32 points on 11-of-13 shooting against Palm Beach State College. He was recognized as NABC NJCAA Player of the Year and was a first-team NJCAA Division I All-American. Duarte was also named Panhandle Player of the Year by both the media and coaches vote.

Oregon (2019–2021) 
Duarte made his debut for Oregon on November 5, 2019, against Fresno State, finishing with 16 points in a 71–57 win. On December 29, Duarte scored a junior season-high 31 points, shooting 12-of-15 from the field and 6-of-9 from three-point range, to go with six assists and five rebounds in a 98–59 win over Alabama State. One day later, he was named Pac-12 Conference Player of the Week. On January 23, 2020, Duarte recorded 30 points, 11 rebounds and eight steals in a 79–70 victory over USC. He set the Matthew Knight Arena record for single-game steals and became the first Division I player with at least 30 points, 11 rebounds and eight steals since Niagara's Alvin Young in 1999. Duarte was subsequently named Pac-12 Player of the Week for his second time and United States Basketball Writers Association (USBWA) National Player of the Week. He finished the season averaging 12.9 points, 5.6 rebounds and 1.7 steals per game, collecting both All-Pac-12 honorable mention and Pac-12 All-Defensive honorable mention.

During the 2020–21 season, Duarte led the Ducks to an appearance in the Sweet Sixteen of the NCAA Division I men's basketball tournament. On April 3, 2021, Duarte was named recipient of the 2021 Jerry West Award as the top shooting guard in men's collegiate basketball.  Duarte was additionally recognized as the AP Pac-12 Player of the Year and an AP Third Team All-American.

On March 29, 2021, Oregon head coach Dana Altman indicated in a press conference that Duarte would enter the 2021 NBA draft.

Professional career

Indiana Pacers (2021–present) 
Duarte was selected with the 13th pick in the 2021 NBA draft by the Indiana Pacers. On August 4, 2021, he signed a rookie scale contract with the Pacers. On October 20, Duarte made his NBA debut, recording 27 points on 6–9 three point shooting, five rebounds along with a steal to set the Pacers' franchise record for the most points in a rookie debut, in a 123–122 loss to the Charlotte Hornets. On April 4, 2022, he was ruled out for the remainder of the season with a toe injury. Duarte was selected to the 2022 NBA All-Rookie Second Team.

Career statistics

NBA

|-
| style="text-align:left;"| 
| style="text-align:left;"| Indiana
| 55 || 39 || 28.0 || .432 || .369 || .804 || 4.1 || 2.1 || 1.0 || .2 || 13.1
|- class="sortbottom"
| style="text-align:center;" colspan="2"| Career
| 55 || 39 || 28.0 || .432 || .369 || .804 || 4.1 || 2.1 || 1.0 || .2 || 13.1

College

NCAA Division I

|-
| style="text-align:left;"| 2019–20
| style="text-align:left;"| Oregon
| 28 || 28 || 30.1 || .414 || .336 || .795 || 5.6 || 1.6 || 1.7 || .5 || 12.9
|-
| style="text-align:left;"| 2020–21
| style="text-align:left;"| Oregon
| 26 || 26 || 34.1 || .532 || .424 || .810 || 4.6 || 2.7 || 1.9 || .8 || 17.1
|- class="sortbottom"
| style="text-align:center;" colspan="2"| Career
| 54 || 54 || 32.0 || .473 || .380 || .803 || 5.1 || 2.1 || 1.8 || .7 || 14.9

JUCO

|-
| style="text-align:left;"| 2017–18
| style="text-align:left;"| Northwest Florida State
| 32 || 1 || 23.3 || .546 || .367 || .700 || 6.7 || 1.8 || 2.0 || .4 || 12.1
|-
| style="text-align:left;"| 2018–19
| style="text-align:left;"| Northwest Florida State
| 33 || 33 || 31.1 || .541 || .400 || .808 || 7.1 || 2.5 || 1.2 || 1.1 || 19.0
|- class="sortbottom"
| style="text-align:center;" colspan="2"| Career
| 65 || 34 || 27.2 || .543 || .388 || .765 || 6.9 || 2.2 || 1.6 || .7 || 15.6

References

External links
 Oregon Ducks bio
 Northwest Florida State Raiders bio

1997 births
Living people
All-American college men's basketball players
Dominican Republic men's basketball players
Indiana Pacers draft picks
Indiana Pacers players
Northwest Florida State Raiders men's basketball players
Oregon Ducks men's basketball players
People from Puerto Plata, Dominican Republic
Shooting guards
National Basketball Association players from the Dominican Republic
Dominican Republic expatriate basketball people in the United States
Dominican Republic basketball players
Mixed-race Dominicans